This is a list of events in Scottish television from 1961.

Events
11 January – North of Scotland Television Ltd changes its name to Grampian Television.
1 September – Border Television, the ITV franchise for the Anglo-Scottish border region, goes on air.
30 September – At 2.45pm, Grampian Television, the ITV franchise for North East Scotland, goes on air.

Television series
Scotsport (1957–2008)
The White Heather Club (1958–1968)

Births
February – Ross Kemp, actor, television presenter and writer
10 April – Nicky Campbell, radio and television presenter
14 April – Robert Carlyle, actor
17 May – Bryan Elsley, television writer
24 June – Iain Glen, actor
23 September – Lesley Fitz-Simons, actress (d. 2013)
18 November – Steven Moffat, television writer and producer
23 December – Carol Smillie, television personality
Unknown – Graham McTavish, actor

See also
1961 in Scotland

 
Television in Scotland by year
1960s in Scottish television